The following lists events that happened during 1935 in New Zealand.

Population
 Estimated population as of 31 December: 1,569,700
 Increase since previous 31 December 1934: 11,300 (0.73%)
 Males per 100 females: 103.1

Incumbents

Regal and viceregal
Head of State – George V
Governor-General – The Lord Bledisloe GCMG KBE PC, succeeded same year by The Viscount Galway GCMG DSO OBE PC

Government
The 24th New Zealand Parliament continued with the coalition of the United Party and the Reform Party. In November the 1935 New Zealand general election resulted in a massive win for the opposition Labour Party.

Speaker of the House – Charles Statham
Prime Minister – George Forbes then Michael Joseph Savage
Minister of Finance – Gordon Coates then Walter Nash
Minister of Foreign Affairs – George Forbes then Michael Joseph Savage
Attorney-General – George Forbes then Rex Mason
Chief Justice – Sir Michael Myers

Parliamentary opposition
 Leader of the Opposition – Michael Joseph Savage (Labour) until 6 December, then George Forbes (United/Reform).

Main centre leaders
Mayor of Auckland – George Hutchison then Ernest Davis
Mayor of Wellington – Thomas Hislop
Mayor of Christchurch – Dan Sullivan
Mayor of Dunedin – Edwin Thomas Cox

Events 

 13 February: Fourth session of the 24th Parliament commences.
 5 April: Parliament goes into recess.
 29 June: The Christchurch Times ceases publication. The newspaper began as the Lyttelton Times in 1851.
 29 August: Parliament recommences.
 26 October: Fourth session of the 24th Parliament concludes.
 1 November: The 24th Parliament is dissolved.
 26 November: Voting in the four Māori electorates for the 1935 General Election.
 27 November: Voting in the 76 general electorates for the 1935 General Election.

Arts and literature

See 1935 in art, 1935 in literature, :Category:1935 books

Music

See: 1935 in music

Radio

See: Public broadcasting in New Zealand

Film
Down on the Farm
Hei Tiki / Primitive Passions
New Zealand's Charm: A Romantic Outpost of Empire 
Magic Playgrounds in New Zealand's Geyserland 

See: :Category:1935 film awards, 1935 in film, List of New Zealand feature films, Cinema of New Zealand, :Category:1935 films

Sport

Chess
 The 44th National Chess Championship was held in Christchurch, and was won by J.A. Erskine of Invercargill.

Golf
 The 25th New Zealand Open championship was won by Alex Murray.
 The 39th National Amateur Championships were held in Christchurch
 Men: J.P. Hornabrook (Masterton)
 Women: Miss J. Anderson

Horse racing

Harness racing
New Zealand Trotting Cup – Indianapolis (2nd win)
 Auckland Trotting Cup – Graham Direct

Lawn bowls
The national outdoor lawn bowls championships are held in Auckland.
 Men's singles champion – Arthur Engebretsen (Napier Bowling Club)
 Men's pair champions – H.G. Loveridge, R.N. Pilkington (skip) (Hamilton Bowling Club)
 Men's fours champions – William Edward Mincham, L.G. Donaldson, William James Liversidge, H. Whittle (skip) (Grey Lynn Bowling Club)

Rugby union
:Category:Rugby union in New Zealand, :Category:All Blacks
 Ranfurly Shield

Rugby league
New Zealand national rugby league team

Soccer
 The Chatham Cup is won by Hospital of Wellington who beat Western of Christchurch 3–1 in the final.
 Provincial league champions:
	Auckland:	Ponsonby AFC (Auckland)
	Canterbury:	Western
	Hawke's Bay:	Napier YMCA
	Nelson:	YMCA
	Otago:	Maori Hill
	Southland:	Corinthians
	Waikato:	Huntly Starr Utd
	Wanganui:	Thistle
	Wellington:	Hospital

Births

January
 2 January – Bill Snowden, rugby league player
 3 January – Rata Harrison, rugby league player
 9 January
 John Graham, rugby union player and administrator, educator
 Stewart McKnight, cricketer
 16 January – Muru Walters, rugby union player, Anglican bishop
 21 January – Mick Cossey, rugby union player
 23 January – Bill Culbert, artist

February
 5 February – Gordon Parkinson, public servant, diplomat
 6 February – Reg Boorman, politician
 10 February
 Mark Irwin, rugby union player
 Ian Kerr, field hockey player
 16 February – Robin Clark, chemist
 22 February – Barry Anderson, composer
 23 February
 John Osmers, Anglican bishop, anti-apartheid activist
 Derek Round, journalist
 25 February – Neville Scott, athlete
 27 February
 James Cooke, sailor
 Edward Te Whiu, convicted murderer

March
 3 March – Peter Elworthy, farming leader, businessman
 5 March – Brian Wybourne, physicist
 8 March – Mansfield Rangi, cricket umpire
 12 March – Maurice Rae, athlete
 19 March – Wes Sandle, physicist
 25 March – Tim Eliott, actor
 29 March  – John Armstrong, politician

April
 3 April – Marrion Roe, swimmer
 4 April – Geoff Braybrooke, politician
 13 April – Kenneth Hayr, Royal Air Force commander
 16 April – Lois Muir, netball player and coach
 22 April – Dick Conway, rugby union player
 30 April – Bruce Bodle, cricketer

May
 11 May
 Gwyn Evans, association footballer
 Stuart O'Connell, Roman Catholic bishop
 15 May
 Barry Crump, author
 Kevin Percy, field hockey player
 Blair Robson, rally driver
 19 May – Brian MacDonell, politician
 27 May – Guy Jansen, choral musician and music educator
 31 May
 Jim Bolger, politician
 Bruce Bolton, cricketer
 William Holt, cricketer

June
 1 June – Margot Forde, botanist
 2 June – Ross Gillespie, field hockey player and coach
 3 June – Raoul Franklin, physicist
 11 June – Alan Ward, historian
 14 June – Mervyn Thompson, playwright, theatre director
 17 June – Ron Carter, businessman
 22 June – Koro Wētere, politician
 25 June – Margaret Sparrow, physician, reproductive rights advocate, author
 29 June – Manu Maniapoto, rugby union player
 30 June – John Turnbull, cricketer

July
 10 July – Wilson Whineray, rugby union player, businessman
 11 July – Bruce Bricknell, cricket umpire
 14 July – Leon Phillips, physical chemist
 22 July – Tuppy Diack, rugby union player
 28 July – Tom Delahunty, association football referee
 29 July – Iain Gillies, association footballer
 31 July – Peter Siddell, artist

August
 9 August – Des Connor, rugby union player
 18 August – Howard Morrison, entertainer

September
 1 September – Graeme Lee, politician
 4 September – John Kneebone, farming leader
 7 September – Douglas Sturkey, diplomat
 11 September – Jim Williams, Pentacostal pastor
 24 September – Vincent Orange, historian
 26 September – Ralph Roberts, sailor, sports administrator

October
 3 October – Judy Bailey, pianist, composer
 4 October – Lyndsey Leask, softball administrator
 6 October – John Anslow, field hockey player
 7 October – Barrie Devenport, marathon swimmer
 9 October
 Paul Barton, cricketer
 Jeff Julian, athlete
 10 October – Michael Henderson, fencer
 16 October
 David Hoskin, cricket player and administrator
 Brian Maunsell, field hockey player
 18 October – Margaret Beames, children's author
 19 October – Jimmy O'Dea, trade unionist and activist
 26 October – Barry Brickell, potter
 28 October – Moana Manley, swimmer, beauty queen

November
 10 Nomember – Marilyn Duckworth, writer
 15 November – Ken Douglas, trade unionist
 22 November – Don Selwyn, actor, filmmaker
 24 November – Bruce Palmer, jurist
 28 November – Bob Binning, fencer

December
 4 December – Gerald Hensley, public servant, diplomat
 5 December
 Marise Chamberlain, athlete
 Max Gimblett, artist
 7 December – Robin Dudding, journalist, literary editor
 10 December – Max Cryer, entertainer, broadcaster, writer
 13 December – Richard Sylvan, philosopher, logician, environmentalist
 17 December – Ray Puckett, athlete, croquet player
 20 December – Billy Ibadulla, cricket player, coach and commentator
 21 December – Don Neely, cricket player, selector and writer
 23 December – Warren Johnston, cyclist
 29 December – Russell Watt, rugby union player
 31 December – Billy Apple, pop artist

Undated
 Ken Blackburn, actor
 Edmund Bohan, historian, singer, author
 Arthur Everard, filmmaker, journalist, chief censor
 Joseph Musaphia, actor
 Howard Williams, potter
 Peter Wolfenden, harness-racing driver

Deaths

January–February
 3 January – Francis Redwood, Roman Catholic archbishop (born 1839)
 14 January – Mita Taupopoki, Tūhourangi and Ngāti Wāhiao leader (born )
 18 January
 Robert Hughes (conservationist), lawyer, politician, conservationist (born 1847)
 John Macmillan Brown, university academic and administrator (born 1845)
 22 January – James Blacklock, cricketer (born 1883)
 28 January – Matthew Barnett, bookmaker, philanthropist (born 1859)
 1 February – William Sadlier, Anglican bishop (born 1867)
 4 February – Robert Logan, soldier, colonial administrator (born 1863)

March–April
 2 March – Pat McEvedy, rugby union player and administrator (born 1880)
 4 March
 Charles Barton, businessman, politician, civic administrator (born 1852)
 William Kilgour, cricketer (born 1878)
 5 March – Frances Fletcher, artist (born 1846)
 10 March  – Charles Thorn, trade unionist, politician (born 1847)
 19 March – James Randall Corrigan, politician (born 1865)
 26 March
 Arthur Atkinson, lawyer, politician (born 1863)
 John Mallard, cricketer (born 1860)
 7 April – Adrian Langerwerf, Roman Catholic missionary, writer (born 1876)
 13 April – James McDonald, painter filmmaker, museum director (born 1865)
 16 April – Dolla Richmond, painter (born 1861)

May–June
 1 May – George Carter, lawn bowls player, accountant (born 1883)
 6 May – Kate Edger, school principal, first woman in New Zealand to earn a university degree (born 1857)
 22 May – Edwin Davy, rugby union player (born 1850)
 27 May
 John Dart, Anglican priest (born 1855)
 Phomen Singh, confectioner (born )
 29 May
 Harry Bayly, cricketer (born 1862)
 Samuel Goldstein, rabbi, scholar, community leader (born 1852)
 2 June
 George Pearce, politician (born 1863)
 Sir Alfred Robin, military leader (born 1860)
 7 June – Elizabeth McCombs, politician, first female MP in New Zealand (born 1873)
 13 June – Jim Coucher, Australian rules footballer (born 1874)
 20 June – William Ferguson, civil engineer (born 1852)
 25 June – Alfred Cousins, engraver and postage stamp designer (born 1852)
 26 June – Charles Corfe, cricketer, headmaster (born 1847)

July–August
 12 July – Nurse Maude, district nursing pioneer (born 1862)
 29 July – Dan Udy, rugby union player (born 1874)
 12 August – Albert Geddes, cricketer (born 1871)
 17 August – James Craigie, businessman, politician (born 1851)

September–October
 2 October – Jeremiah Connolly, politician (born 1875)
 3 October – Harry Knight, farmer, politician, racehorse owner (born 1860)
 5 October – William Stevenson, politician (born 1864)
 7 October
 James Garrow, legal academic (born 1865)
 Sidney Williamson, singer, conductor and singing teacher (born )
 11 October – Sir James Coates, banker (born 1851)
 12 October – Victorine Goddard, hotelkeeper (born 1844)
 18 October – Ernie Booth, rugby union player (born 1876)
 23 October – Ernest Upham, cricketer, lawyer (born 1873)
 24 October – James Gibb, Presbyterian minister, pacifist (born 1857)

November–December
 6 November – Catherine Carran, midwife (born 1842)
 20 November – John Jellicoe, 1st Earl Jellicoe, governor-general (1920–1924) (born 1859)
 25 November – Kenneth Williams, politician (born 1870)
 7 December – Philip de la Perrelle, newspaper proprietor, politician (born 1872)
 14 December – Mother Josepha, Roman Catholic nun, teacher (born 1863)
 15 December – George James Anderson, politician (born 1860)
 23 December – Charles Speight, rugby union player, politician (born 1870)

See also
History of New Zealand
List of years in New Zealand
Military history of New Zealand
Timeline of New Zealand history
Timeline of New Zealand's links with Antarctica
Timeline of the New Zealand environment

References

External links

 
Years of the 20th century in New Zealand